The Frankfurter Ring is an approximately  long street in the districts Milbertshofen and Freimann of Munich, Germany.

It is connected to Moosacher Straße (west) and Föhringer Ring (east).
The subway station of the same name Frankfurter Ring is next to it.

The street is named after the city of Frankfurt.

References

Streets in Munich
Milbertshofen-Am Hart